The Laguerre transformations or axial homographies are an analogue of Möbius transformations over the dual numbers. When studying these transformations, the dual numbers are often interpreted as representing oriented lines on the plane. The Laguerre transformations map lines to lines, and include in particular all isometries of the plane.

Strictly speaking, these transformations act on the dual number projective line, which adjoins to the dual numbers a set of points at infinity. Topologically, this projective line is equivalent to a cylinder. Points on this cylinder are in a natural one-to-one correspondence with oriented lines on the plane.

Definition 

A dual number is a hypercomplex number of the form  where  but . This can be compared to the complex numbers which are of the form  where .

The points of the dual number projective line can be defined equivalently in two ways:

 The usual set of dual numbers, but with some additional "points at infinity". The points at infinity can be expressed as  where  is an arbitrary real number. Different values of  correspond to different points at infinity. These points are infinite because  is often understood as being an infinitesimal number, and so  is therefore infinite.
 The homogeneous coordinates [x : y] with x and y dual numbers such that the ideal that they generate is the whole ring of dual numbers. The ring is viewed through  the injection x -> [x: 1]. The projective line includes points [1: yε].

Line coordinates 
See also Line coordinates#With complex numbers

A line which makes an angle  with the x-axis, and whose x-intercept is denoted , is represented by the dual number

The above doesn't make sense when the line is parallel to the x-axis. In that case, if  then set  where  is the y-intercept of the line. This may not appear to be valid, as one is dividing by a zero divisor, but this is a valid point on the projective dual line. If  then set .

Finally, observe that these coordinates represent oriented lines. An oriented line is an ordinary line with one of two possible orientations attached to it. This can be seen from the fact that if  is increased by  then the resulting dual number representative is not the same.

Matrix representations 

It's possible to express the above line coordinates as homogeneous coordinates  where  is the perpendicular distance of the line from the origin. This representation has numerous advantages: One advantage is that there is no need to break into different cases, such as parallel to the -axis and non-parallel. The other advantage is that these homogeneous coordinates can be interpreted as vectors, allowing us to multiply them by matrices.

Every Laguerre transformation can be represented as a 2x2 matrix whose entries are dual numbers. Additionally, as long as the determinant of a 2x2 dual-numbered matrix is not nilpotent, then it represents a Laguerre transformation.

(Note that in the above, we represent the homogeneous vector  as a column vector in the obvious way, instead of as a row vector.)

Points, oriented lines and oriented circles 
Laguerre transformations do not act on points. This is because if three oriented lines pass through the same point, their images under a Laguerre transformation do not have to meet at one point.

Laguerre transformations can be seen as acting on oriented circles as well as oriented lines. A point is defined to be an oriented circle of radius zero. The radius of an oriented circle is defined to be the radius  of the underlying unoriented circle multiplied by the orientation.

The image of an oriented circle under a Laguerre transformation is another oriented circle. If two oriented figures -- either circles or lines -- are tangent to each other then their images under a Laguerre transformation are also tangent. Two oriented circles are defined to be tangent if their underlying circles are tangent and their orientations are equal at the point of contact. Tangency between lines and circles is defined similarly. A Laguerre transformation might map a point to an oriented circle which is no longer a point.

An oriented circle can never be mapped to an oriented line. Likewise, an oriented line can never be mapped to an oriented circle. This is opposite to Mobius geometry, where lines and circles can be mapped to each other, but neither can be mapped to points. Both Mobius geometry and Laguerre geometry are subgeometries of Lie sphere geometry, where points and oriented lines can be mapped to each other, but tangency remains preserved.

The matrix representations of oriented circles (which include points but not lines) are precisely the invertible  skew-Hermitian dual number matrices. These are all of the form  (where all the variables are real, and ). The set of oriented lines tangent to an oriented circle is given by  where  denotes the projective line over the dual numbers . The radius of an oriented circle is equal to the half the trace. The orientation is then the sign of the trace.

Profile 

Note that the animated figures below show some oriented lines, but without any visual indication of a line's orientation (so two lines that differ only in orientation are displayed in the same way); oriented circles are shown as a set of oriented tangent lines, which results in a certain visual effect.

The following can be found in Isaak Yaglom's Complex numbers in geometry and a paper by Gutin entitled Generalizations of singular value decomposition to dual-numbered matrices.

Unitary matrices 
Mappings of the form  express rigid body motions (sometimes called direct Euclidean isometries). The matrix representations of these transformations span a subalgebra isomorphic to the planar quaternions.

The mapping  represents a reflection about the x-axis.

The transformation  expresses a reflection about the y-axis.

Observe that if  is the matrix representation of any combination of the above three transformations, but normalised so as to have determinant , then  satisfies  where  means . We will call these unitary matrices. Notice though that these are unitary in the sense of the dual numbers and not the complex numbers. The unitary matrices express precisely the Euclidean isometries.

Axial dilation matrices 
An axial dilation by  units is a transformation of the form . An axial dilation by  units increases the radius of all oriented circles by  units while preserving their centres. If a circle has negative orientation, then its radius is considered negative, and therefore for some positive values of  the circle actually shrinks. An axial dilation is depicted in Figure 1, in which two circles of opposite orientations undergo the same axial dilation.

Lines that are parallel but have opposite orientations move in opposite directions.

Real diagonal matrices 

The transformation  for a value of  that's real preserves the x-intercept of a line, while changing its angle to the x-axis. See Figure 2 to observe the effect on a grid of lines (including the x axis in the middle) and Figure 3 to observe the effect on two circles that differ initially only in orientation (to see that the outcome is sensitive to orientation).

A general decomposition 
The matrices  and  express Euclidean isometries. The matrix  either represents a transformation of the form  or an axial dilation. The resemblance to Singular Value Decomposition should be clear.

Note: In the event that  is an axial dilation, the factor  can be set to the identity matrix. So .

Other number systems and the parallel postulate

Complex numbers and elliptic geometry 
A question arises: What happens if the role of the dual numbers above is changed to the complex numbers? In that case, the complex numbers represent oriented lines in the elliptic plane (the plane which elliptic geometry takes places over). This is in contrast to the dual numbers, which represent oriented lines in the Euclidean plane. The elliptic plane is essentially a sphere (but where antipodal points are identified), and the lines are thus great circles. We can choose an arbitrary great circle to be the equator. The oriented great circle which intersects the equator at longitude , and makes an angle  with the equator at the point of intersection, can be represented by the complex number . Similar to the case of the dual numbers, the unitary matrices act as isometries of the elliptic plane. The set of "elliptic Laguerre transformations" (which are the analogues of the Laguerre transformations in this setting) can be decomposed using Singular Value Decomposition of complex matrices, in a similar way to how we decomposed Euclidean Laguerre transformations using an analogue of Singular Value Decomposition for dual-number matrices.

Split-complex numbers and hyperbolic geometry 

(Notice though that as a *-algebra, as opposed to a mere algebra, the split-complex numbers are not decomposable in this way). Indeed, this hints that .

The analogue of unitary matrices over the split-complex numbers are the isometries of the hyperbolic plane. This is shown by Yaglom. Furthermore, the set of linear fractional transformations can be decomposed in a way that resembles Singular Value Decomposition, but which also unifies it with the Jordan decomposition.

Summary 
We therefore have a correspondence between the three planar number systems (complex, dual and split-complex numbers) and the three non-Euclidean geometries. The number system that corresponds to Euclidean geometry is the dual numbers.

In higher dimensions

Euclidean 
n-dimensional Laguerre space is isomorphic to n+1 Minkowski space. The group of Laguerre transformations is isomorphic then to the Poincaré group . These transformations are exactly those which preserve a kind of squared distance between oriented circles called their Darboux product. The direct Laguerre transformations are defined as the subgroup . In 2 dimensions, the direct Laguerre transformations can be represented by 2x2 dual number matrices. If the 2x2 dual number matrices are understood as constituting the Clifford algebra , then analogous Clifford algebraic representations are possible in higher dimensions.

If we embed Minkowski space  in the projective space  while keeping the transformation group the same, then the points at infinity are oriented flats. We call them "flats" because their shape is flat. In 2 dimensions, these are the oriented lines.

As an aside, there are two non-equivalent definitions of a Laguerre transformation: Either as a Lie sphere transformation that preserves oriented flats, or as a Lie sphere transformation that preserves the Darboux product. We use the latter convention in this article. Note that even in 2 dimensions, the former transformation group is more general than the latter: A homothety for example maps oriented lines to oriented lines, but does not in general preserve the Darboux product. This therefore only gives a Laguerre transformation when .

Elliptic

Hyperbolic

Conformal interpretation
In this section, we interpret Laguerre transformations differently from in the rest of the article. When acting on line coordinates, Laguerre transformations are not understood to be conformal in the sense described here. This is clearly demonstrated in Figure 2.

The Laguerre transformations preserve  angles when the  proper angle for the dual number plane is identified. When a ray y = mx, x ≥ 0, and the positive x-axis are taken for sides of an angle, the slope m is the magnitude of this angle.

This number m corresponds to the area of the right triangle with base on the interval [0, √2]. The line {1 + aε: a ∈ ℝ}, with the dual number multiplication, forms a subgroup of the unit dual numbers, each element being a shear mapping when acting on the dual number plane. Other angles in the plane are generated by such action, and since shear mapping preserves area, the size  of these angles is the same as the original.

Note that the inversion z to 1/z leaves angle size invariant. As the general Laguerre transformation  is generated by translations, dilations, shears, and inversions, and all of these leave angle invariant, the general Laguerre transformation is conformal in the sense of these angles.

See also 
 Edmond Laguerre
 Laguerre plane
 Isaak Yaglom
 Line coordinates

References 

Lie groups
Functions and mappings
Projective geometry
Hypercomplex numbers
Geometry

External links 

"Oriented circles and 3D relativistic geometry" An elementary video introducing concepts in Laguerre geometry. The video is presented from the rational trigonometry perspective